Gary Robert Shuchuk (born February 17, 1967) is a Canadian professional ice hockey coach and former forward who is currently an assistant coach with Grizzlys Wolfsburg of the Deutsche Eishockey Liga. He played in the National Hockey League (NHL) between 1991 and 1996. The rest of his career, which lasted from 1990 to 2004, was spent in the minor leagues and later in Europe. After his playing career Shuchuk turned to coaching and spent several years at the American collegiate level.

College career

Born in Edmonton, Alberta, Shuchuk committed to the University of Wisconsin during his second year playing for the St. Albert Saints of the Alberta Junior Hockey League. He played 4 years for the Badgers from 1986-1990. During that time he won a WCHA Championship, an NCAA Championship, and was named a First-Team All-American. During the 1989-1990 Season he accumulated 80 points (41 goals, 39 assists), which currently ranks 6th all time for total points in a season in Wisconsin Hockey history, his 41 goals that season also ranks 4th in the program's history. Other notable historic statistics include: 2nd all time in Wisconsin Hockey program history for number of games played (177 GP), 5th all time in career penalty minutes (314 PIMs), 7th all time in career goals (85 G), and 12th all time in career points (176 pts).

Professional career

Shuchuk started his National Hockey League career with the Detroit Red Wings in 1990. Shuchuk then went to the Los Angeles Kings as part of the Paul Coffey-Jimmy Carson trade, and is probably best known for scoring the game-winning goal for the Kings in double overtime of game 5 of the 1993 Smythe Division finals against the Vancouver Canucks. During the 1993 season, Shuchuk and the Los Angeles Kings made it to the Stanley Cup Finals, before falling to the Montreal Canadiens in 5 games. In addition to his time in the NHL, Shuchuk played in the IHL, and the AHL, with the Adirondack Red Wings, Houston Aeros, Phoenix Roadrunners, and the Orlando Solar Bears. He went on to play in Europe, having played for SC Herisau in the Swiss 1. Liga, for EC KAC in the Austrian Hockey League, as well as Düsseldorfer EG and Krefeld Pinguine of the Deutsche Eishockey Liga. During the 2002-03 DEL season, he captained the Krefeld Pinguine to their first league championship in over 50 years.

International career

Shuchuk played for Team Canada in the 1990 Goodwill Games winning a Bronze Medal in the process. He also captained Team Canada to a Gold Medal in the 2002 Deutschland Cup. He was once again elected to Team Canada for the 2003 Deutschland Cup.

Coaching career

Shuchuk was a Player Assistant Coach for the Springfield Falcons for the 2003-04 AHL season. In 2010 he was hired as an Assistant Coach for the Wisconsin Badgers men's ice hockey team. He helped the program reach two NCAA Division I Men's Ice Hockey Tournament's, as well as winning the 2014 Big Ten Men's Ice Hockey Tournament. In 2015 he went on to become an Assistant Coach for the Michigan Tech Huskies men's ice hockey team, helping the program win the 2017 WCHA Men's Ice Hockey Tournament and securing a spot in the 2017 NCAA Division I Men's Ice Hockey Tournament. In 2017, he was named the head coach of the Janesville Jets of the North American Hockey League.

Career statistics

Regular season and playoffs

Awards and honors

References

External links

1967 births
Living people
Adirondack Red Wings players
AHCA Division I men's ice hockey All-Americans
Canadian expatriate ice hockey players in Austria
Canadian expatriate ice hockey players in Germany
Canadian ice hockey centres
Canadian people of Ukrainian descent
Competitors at the 1990 Goodwill Games
Detroit Red Wings draft picks
Detroit Red Wings players
Düsseldorfer EG players
Houston Aeros (1994–2013) players
EC KAC players
Krefeld Pinguine players
Los Angeles Kings players
National Hockey League supplemental draft picks
NCAA men's ice hockey national champions
Orlando Solar Bears (IHL) players
Phoenix Roadrunners (IHL) players
SC Herisau players
Ice hockey people from Edmonton
Springfield Falcons players
Wisconsin Badgers men's ice hockey players